B-value may refer to:
 Important characteristic of a thermistor (B parameter)
 B-factor in crystallography
 Constant b in Gutenberg–Richter law
 Acquisition parameter in diffusion MRI